John Farmer (born 31 August 1947) is an English former footballer who played in the Football League for Leicester City and Stoke City.

Career
Farmer was a product of Stoke City's youth system after being found playing amateur football in his local town of Biddulph. He broke into the first team in 1966 at the age of eighteen and is therefore one of the youngest keepers ever to play for the club. He initially began to play regularly for Stoke but when Farmer was 20 years old manager Tony Waddington signed England world cup winner Gordon Banks and Farmer lost his place as number one. He however resisted the chances to switch clubs and remained loyal to Stoke providing useful back-up to Banks. Farmer reclaimed his starting spot in 1972–73 as Banks was involved in a car crash which left him blind in one eye and as a result had to retire from playing top flight football.

He played regularly for three seasons until another England 'keeper, Peter Shilton joined Stoke in November 1974 for a then world record fee for a goalkeeper of £325,000. Farmer then joined the club that Shilton had come from, Leicester City, and played twice for the "Foxes" before returning to Stoke. He left Stoke at the end of the 1974–75 and went on to play for Northwich Victoria.

Career statistics
Source:

Honours
 Stoke City
 Football League Cup winner: 1972

References

External links
 

English footballers
England under-23 international footballers
Stoke City F.C. players
Leicester City F.C. players
English Football League players
1947 births
Living people
Cleveland Stokers players
Northwich Victoria F.C. players
People from Biddulph
United Soccer Association players
Association football goalkeepers
English expatriate sportspeople in the United States
Expatriate soccer players in the United States
English expatriate footballers